The Night of the Crime (French: La nuit du crime, Arabic: ليلة قتل) is a 1992 Moroccan film directed by Nabyl Lahlou.

Synopsis 
Salim, a reporter, is having trouble with his wife Nadia. They have lost their passion for each other, and Nadia falls in love with Miloud, Salim's driver. Miloud then murders his boss.

Cast 

 Nabyl Lahlou
 Sophia Hadi
 Safy Boutella
 Salim Berrada
 Mohamed Kaghat
 Khadija Marrakchi

References 

1992 films
Moroccan drama films
1990s Arabic-language films
Films directed by Nabyl Lahlou